Scott Robertson (born 21 August 1974) is a New Zealand rugby union coach and former player. He grew up in Tauranga and attended Mount Maunganui College  in the Bay of Plenty. His position as a player was flanker and he played for  Bay of Plenty, Perpignan, Canterbury, the Crusaders and the All Blacks. He was  the head coach of the New Zealand U20 rugby union team and the Canterbury ITM Cup Team. He has been the Crusaders' head coach since 2017, replacing Todd Blackadder.

Playing career
Robertson played domestically for Bay of Plenty. 

In 1996 he moved to Canterbury to play for the Crusaders in the first year of the newly formed Super 12 rugby competition. He played at flanker which was his preferred position in the forwards.

After leaving the Crusaders, Robertson moved to Europe, where he played for a number of clubs, including Ards (Northern Ireland) and Perpignan (France). He eventually moved to Japan where he played for the Ricoh Black Rams, before retiring in 2007.

After retiring from rugby he began his coaching career.

Coaching career
Robertson became the head coach at Sumner Rugby Club in Christchurch, New Zealand.  In 2004 he was active in establishing an under 19 team at Sumner. Coaches Richard Notley and Paul Fremeaux were appointed. The Under 19 side progressed to colts level. Ben Richdale, captain of the U.19/Colts was part of the Sumner Wave side that gained promotion to section 1 Canterbury Metro.

After working as the assistant coach of the Canterbury Rugby Football Union for five years under, respectively, head coaches Rob Penney (2008-2011) and Tabai Matson (2012), Robertson was appointed Canterbury's head coach in 2013, when they won the Final in the Premiership Division of the ITM Cup. Under his guidance, Canterbury won the competition again in 2015.

In 2014, the NZ Rugby Union appointed Robertson as head coach of the New Zealand Under-20 Rugby team, which subsequently won the 2015 World Rugby Under 20 Championship in Italy.

Robertson coached the New Zealand Under-20 Rugby team to the 2016 World Rugby Under 20 Championship in Manchester, where they failed to make the play-offs.

In June 2016, Robertson was appointed head coach for the Crusaders for the 2017-2019 Super Rugby seasons. During the 2017 season Robertson captured a Super Rugby title with a 25-17 victory over the Lions, becoming only the second first-year coach to win a championship after Dave Rennie in 2012 with conference rivals the Chiefs. On 4 August 2018 he achieved a second straight Super Rugby title with his Crusaders team again defeating the Lions 37-18, again following in the footsteps of Rennie being the second rookie coach to win 2 titles in 2 seasons.
In winning the Crusaders' third successive title, Robertson became the first "rookie" Super Rugby coach to win 3 successive titles in their first three seasons as a head coach. The last time a team won three titles in a row was the Crusaders as well between 1998 & 2000, where Wayne Smith led them to two championships before taking up a role with the All Blacks, Robbie Deans would then claim the third title in 2000 beginning one of the most successful periods in the franchise's history.

In 2020, and 2021 Robertson coached the Crusaders to two successful Super Rugby Aotearoa championships. These were both considered a soft-competition on the Super Level due to the pandemic and only playing 5 New Zealand teams, with many of the teams suffering key player losses early on. Since becoming head coach of the Crusaders, the only competition he hasn't won was the 2021 Super Rugby Trans-Tasman add-on, and despite earning 5 wins from 5 games, the Crusaders only ranked third (based on points difference), and missed the final.
Following on from the successful Super Rugby Aotearoa campaigns, Robertson again coached the Crusaders to a championship, this time in the maiden Super Rugby Pacific Format in 2022.

Robertson is known for his post victory match break dancing routine

Media work
Robertson, along with Keven Mealamu became guest commentators for the 2017 British & Irish Lions tour series.

References

Crawford sees him paddle boarding at Sumner.

External links

 Scott Robertson | Rugby Database Player Profile
 Scott Robertson | Rugby Database Coach Profile

1974 births
New Zealand international rugby union players
Canterbury rugby union players
Crusaders (rugby union) players
Living people
New Zealand rugby union players
Rugby union flankers
Rugby union players from Tauranga